Events from 2010 in Cameroon.

Incumbents
 President: Paul Biya
 Prime Minister: Philémon Yang

Events

January

February

March

April

May

June
Cameroon National team played in the 2010 FIFA World Cup. They lost in the group stage round.

July

August

September

October
Cameroon participated in the 2010 Commonwealth Games.

November

December

Deaths

See also
Cameroon national football team 2010
Cameroon at the 2010 Summer Youth Olympics
2010–11 Elite One
Cameroon at the 2010 Commonwealth Games
2010 African Judo Championships
2010 Miss Cameroon beauty pageant
 List of years by country

References

Bibliography

External links
Cameroon Public Holidays 2010 - Calling Cards Japan

 
Cameroon
Years of the 21st century in Cameroon